Allgemeine Schweizerische Uhrenindustrie AG (ASUAG; French: Société Générale de l'Horlogerie Suisse SA) was the former biggest Swiss Watch Industry Group that had been created with the assistance of the Swiss Government and the Swiss Banks, as an answer to the crisis caused by the Great Depression, in 1931.

In 1983, ASUAG and SSIH were forced by the Swiss Banks to merge into Société de Microélectronique et d'Horlogerie (SMH), which now has been renamed  Swatch Group.
ASUAG grouped most of the movement parts & Ebauches manufacturers on one side, and through its sub-holding General Watch Co (GWC); many watch brands on the other side. Most of those companies are still active, integrated into the new conglomerate.

During the years of crisis, from 1978 until 1991, Dr. Ernst Thomke was at the helm of the restructuring, first as CEO of ETA SA, then Ebauches SA, including a mandate as Administrator of ASUAG, and became SMH's first CEO in 1983, a position that he held until 1991. At that time, newly elected President and main shareholder Nicolas G. Hayek had already become the only person of reference.

References

External links 

 History of the creation of ASUAG through the association of the Ebauches companies
  Free English translation
 History of the Swatch Group
 Swatch Group Official History

Watch manufacturing companies of Switzerland
Holding companies established in 1931
Swiss companies established in 1931